The Chief Secretary is the head of the Isle of Man Civil Service. The current Chief Secretary is Caldric Randall.

The Chief Secretary is responsible for the function of the Chief Secretary's Office and provides advice and guidance to the Chief Minister and the Council of Ministers.

List of Chief Secretaries
Peter Hulme,  1979–1989
Fred Kissack, 1989–2002
Mary Williams, 2002–2011
Will Greenhow, 2011–present

Government of the Isle of Man